Canada has at least 34 urban communities at elevations of  or greater above sea level.

References 

Cities in Canada
Elevation